Mani, the founder of Manichaeism, had 12 Apostles like Jesus.

These are some of the known apostles.

 Mar Ammo, Apostle to the Sogdians
 Mar Sisin, the first Manichaean Pope
 possibly Mar Zaku, who may alternatively have been in the second generation
 Mar Adda, who preached in the Roman Empire

References

 .

Manichaeism